Lucky Mobile is a Canadian prepaid mobile virtual network operator and a subsidiary of Bell Canada. Founded in December 2017, Lucky Mobile operates on the Bell Mobility network alongside fellow subsidiary Virgin Plus. It targets the same market segment as discount mobile brands Chatr (owned by Rogers Communications) and Public Mobile (owned by Telus).

History 
After being announced on December 1, 2017, Lucky Mobile launched on December 4. At launch, the network is available for users in 17 metro areas in Canada. The launch was viewed as a way for BCE to compete with the discount mobile brands Chatr and Public Mobile operated by its competitors Rogers Communications and Telus, respectively. Like Chatr, Lucky Mobile offers a limited selection of low end smartphones for sale outright. In March 2018, the carrier's service area expanded to include Saskatchewan and Manitoba.

Network 
Lucky Mobile operates as a mobile virtual network operator offering pre-paid calling, texting, and 3G and 4G throttled speed data running on Bell Mobility's 4G network with pre-paid plans in select Canadian markets. In independent speed tests conducted in April 2018, although the Lucky Mobile network shows as 4G on users’ mobile phones, speed tests show maximum download speeds around 3 Mbps which would indicate that speeds on the Lucky Mobile network are indeed throttled.

Customers with eSIM enabled smartphones and devices are able to purchase eSIM from Lucky mobile and connect to the network without a physical SIM card.

Phones 
Lucky Mobile carries five smartphones and one flip phone.

Retail presence 
Lucky Mobile SIM cards are sold in Visions Electronics, Walmart, Circle K, Glentel (T-Booth Wireless, Wireless Wave), The Source, Giant Tiger and Dollarama locations. In addition, customers can also order cards by phone or on the company's website. At launch, the company does not operate any stand-alone locations.

References

External links
 

Bell Canada
Mobile phone companies of Canada
Telecommunications companies of Canada
Telecommunications companies established in 2017
Canadian companies established in 2017